Yamm may refer to:

Yamm (god), the Ugaritic sea and river god
Yamm (rural locality), a rural locality (village) in Pskov Oblast, Russia